Jatin–Lalit are an Indian film music director duo consisting of Jatin Pandit and his brother Lalit Pandit. They have written the widely popular scores for films such as Yaara Dildara, Khiladi, Jo Jeeta Wohi Sikandar, Kabhi Haan Kabhi Naa, Raju Ban Gaya Gentleman, Khamoshi: The Musical, Dilwale Dulhania Le Jayenge, Fareb, Yes Boss, Jab Pyaar Kisise Hota Hai, Kuch Kuch Hota Hai, Sarfarosh, Ghulam, Pyaar Kiya To Darna Kya, Pyaar To Hona Hi Tha, Khoobsurat, Mohabbatein, Kabhi Khushi Kabhie Gham..., Chalte Chalte, Hum Tum and Fanaa.

Jatin–Lalit is their professional name and appears on the covers of their music albums, CDs and DVDs.

Early life
Jatin and Lalit come from a musical family originating from Pili Mandori Village in Hissar district of Haryana state. Pandit Jasraj was their uncle. They received their musical education primarily from their father, Pandit Pratap Narayan. They were taught guitar and piano by Pyarelal Ramprasad Sharma, of the Laxmikant–Pyarelal duo.

Hindi film actresses Sulakshana Pandit and Vijayta Pandit are their sisters, and late music director Aadesh Shrivastava was their brother-in-law, being married to the younger of the sisters, Vijayta.

Musical career
The creation of the pair Jatin–Lalit was by accident. In the early 80s, Jatin teamed up with Mandheer (elder brother) to team up as Jatin-Mandheer. This pair never had any big hits to their name. However, they earned the badge of working with legends - Kishore Kumar -Wafaa (1990) and Mohd Rafi - Dil Hi Dil Main (1982). Lalit, the youngest brother, was discovering his love for music. Since, the Jatin-Mandheer pair didn't really sizzle in the circuit, and Lalit was eager to make a mark as well, it was decided to revisit the music combination, and thus Jatin -Lalit - the duo, was formed. Their first foray as a pair was a private album Rhythmic Love. This album had quite a few songs, which were later recreated by the pair, in successful films like Yaara Dildaara, Yes Boss.

They began their career in 1991, composing music for the Hindi movie Yaara Dildara. Although the film was a Romantic Film, its music was the biggest hit. The evergreen famous song of the movie was "Bin Tere Sanam", which topped the charts. They were first noticed for their work on the soundtrack of the movie Khiladi and for "Pehla Nasha", a romantic song from Jo Jeeta Wohi Sikander, the film that earned then their first nomination for the Filmfare Award for Best Music Director. Their other film score of 1992, Raju Ban Gaya Gentleman was also very successful.  Their compositions are strongly influenced by R. D. Burman's style of music-making. In 1994, they composed the successful soundtrack to the Shahrukh Khan-starrer Kabhi Haan Kabhi Naa. Jatin–Lalit's score for the cult classic Dilwale Dulhania Le Jayenge was a massive success, and is remembered as one of the all-time best Bollywood soundtracks, earning them another nomination at the Filmfare's. It is the 5th highest selling Bollywood soundtrack of all time. Following this, their successful scores for Khamoshi: The Musical (1996) and Yes Boss (1997), which earned them their third and fourth nominations at the Filmfare Awards cemented their place as Bollywood's top music directors.

Jatin–Lalit's next big success came with Karan Johar's debut directorial, Kuch Kuch Hota Hai, which sold 8.5 million copies and won a nomination for best music at the Filmfare Awards. Pyaar To Hona Hi Tha, in the same year, and Sarfarosh, in 1999 were also appreciated, earning them their fifth and sixth nominations at the Filmfare Awards. Mohabbatein, (2000) directed by Aditya Chopra won acclaim, and the song "Humko Humise Chura Lo" became a classic. This soundtrack was also nominated at the Filmfare Awards, as was Kabhi Khushi Kabhie Gham... (2001), another famous soundtrack that included songs such as "Bole Chudiyaan". Before their split in 2006, some of their successful soundtracks include Chalte Chalte (2003), Hum Tum (2004) and Fanaa (2006), their final collaboration. The three movies won them their tenth, eleventh and twelfth nominations at the Filmfare Awards. Despite being nominated eleven times, Jatin–Lalit never won a Filmfare Award, and hold the record for the most nominations without ever winning.

They have composed a total of 473 songs in 72 films. The duo has worked with a variety of lyricists; Majrooh Sultanpuri, Gopaldas Neeraj, Anand Bakshi, Sameer, Javed Akhtar and singers including Amit Kumar, Kumar Sanu, Abhijeet Bhattacharya, Udit Narayan, Hariharan, Sonu Nigam,K.S.Chithra, Anuradha Paudwal, Alka Yagnik, Kavita Krishnamurthy, Sadhana Sargam, Shaan, Babul Supriyo and many others. Veteran singers Lata Mangeshkar, Asha Bhonsle and Jagjit Singh have also sung in a few movies for the duo. Abhijeet credits Jatin–Lalit with the success of his career, due to songs such as "Yeh Teri Aankhen Jhunki Jhunki", "Main Koi Aisa Geet Gaon", "Chaand Taare" and "Tauba Tumhare Yeh Ishare".

During the last few years of their joint career, their music albums contained several songs composed by other musicians. This practice was not liked by Jatin–Lalit; however, the producer and director insisted on it. In Karan Johar's Kabhi Khushi Kabhie Gham... two of the tracks were composed by Sandesh Shandilya. In Chalte Chalte, Aadesh Shrivastava composed several songs while in Pyaar Kiya To Darna Kya, one song was composed by Himesh Reshammiya and Sajid–Wajid.

They were among the first composers to write songs performed by Bollywood film stars rather than playback singers. The specially composed "Aati Kya Khandala" in the film Ghulam for the lead actor Aamir Khan. Later, they also composed a song for Sanjay Dutt to sing in the movie Khoobsurat.

Jatin–Lalit has composed the highest-selling Bollywood soundtrack of the year on four occasions – Dilwale Dulhania Le Jayenge in 1995, Kuch Kuch Hota Hai in 1998, Mohabbatein in 2000, and Kabhi Khushi Kabhie Gham... in 2001.

Acting career
Jatin and Lalit appeared in the movie Jo Jeeta Wohi Sikandar during the song "Humse Hai Saara Jahaan". Jatin is singing the song, while Lalit is playing the bass guitar (the first shot of the song). Jatin performed the song "Rooth Ke Humse" in the film.

Television career
Jatin–Lalit were appointed as judges in the Zee Television musical show Sa Re Ga Ma Pa. They were judges on another musical show, Star Voice of India. Jatin has appeared as a mentor in TV show Jhoom India. He was judge and mentor in the reality show on Sony TV's Waar Parriwar.

The separation and reunion
After working for almost 16 years together, they announced that they would be parting ways due to personal problems. Reasons for the separation still are unknown.

In February 2020, the Jatin–Lalit duo came together and organised a concert in Mumbai which was very well received and in which numerous leading Bollywood singers performed.

Solo careers
Lalit and Jatin have continued to compose separately.

Lalit scored the 2007 film, Life Mein Kabhie Kabhiee, Showbiz, Horn Ok Pleassss and Dulha Mil Gaya.

Jatin composed the score for Saurav Shukla's film, I Am 24, starring Neha Dhupia and Rajat Kapoor. It is a Planman Motion Films Presentation.

He composed for Raja Sen's film Krishnakanter Will. "I am working on the number. I am trying to make it in such a way that it goes along with the novel written by Bankimchandra Chattopadhyay. The song will be melody-based," says Jatin. He recorded an album for the president of the Indian Business and Professional Council, Abbas Ali Mirza. He is doing the Music for Kundan Shah's next. Considering the strong track record Jatin–Lalit had with Kundan Shah, this film could be the next Kabhi Haa Kabhi Naa for Jatin. Jatin is working on the maiden venture of Gazebo Entertainment's "Saturday Night".

Lalit composed the song "Munni Badnaam Hui" for Dabangg (2010). The song has become hugely popular among the masses. He won the Filmfare Award for Best Music Director with Sajid–Wajid in 2011 for this song, particularly for the quirky lyrics and dancing choreography.

Awards and recognition
Filmfare Awards:
Nominated – Best Music Director (1993) – Jo Jeeta Wohi Sikandar
Nominated – Best Music Director (1996) – Dilwale Dulhania Le Jayenge
Nominated – Best Music Director (1997) – Khamoshi: The Musical
Nominated – Best Music Director (1998) – Yes Boss
Nominated – Best Music Director (1999) – Pyaar To Hona Hi Tha
Nominated – Best Music Director (1999) – Kuch Kuch Hota Hai
Nominated – Best Music Director (2000) – Sarfarosh
Nominated – Best Music Director (2001) – Mohabbatein
Nominated – Best Music Director (2002) – Kabhi Khushi Kabhie Gham...
Nominated – Best Music Director (2004) – Chalte Chalte
Nominated – Best Music Director (2005) – Hum Tum
Nominated – Best Music Director (2007) – Fanaa

Their soundtrack of Dilwale Dulhaniya Le Jayenge was judged the top Hindi soundtrack of all time by on-line voters on the BBC Asian Network. The number two and three positions also went to Jatin–Lalit for their compositions from Kabhi Khushi Kabhie Gham... and Kuch Kuch Hota Hai.

Dilwale Dulhania Le Jayenge has been rated the 6th best soundtrack ever by Planet Bollywood on their "100 Greatest Bollywood Soundtracks". Other soundtracks included in the list are Kabhi Khushi Kabhie Gham... (64), Kuch Kuch Hota Hai (69) and Khamoshi: The Musical (97).

Collaboration with singers
Jatin–Lalit is most remembered for their collaboration with Alka Yagnik. They composed 136 songs for her and this pair has become one of the most sought-after singer-composer duos in music history alongside Asha Bhosle–R. D. Burman, Asha Bhosle–O. P. Nayyar, Asha Bhosle–Bappi Lahiri, Lata Mangeshkar–Laxmikant-Pyarelal, Lata Mangeshkar–R. D. Burman, Lata Mangeshkar–Shankar–Jaikishan, Lata Mangeshkar–Madan Mohan, Lata Mangeshkar–S. D. Burman, Lata Mangeshkar–Salil Chowdhury, Lata Mangeshkar–Khayyam etc. Among males, Jatin–Lalit's most favourite were Kumar Sanu and Udit Narayan. They equally propelled their career with hit after hit. Both singers sang over 100 songs for them.

Discography

Jatin-Lalit

Filmography of Lalit Pandit

Non-film songs

Sales
All-time music sales:

References

External links

 
 
 Biography at Hindilyrix

Indian male composers
Living people
Hindi film score composers
Bollywood playback singers
Songwriting teams
Filmfare Awards winners
People from Jodhpur
Rajasthani people
Indian musical duos
Male film score composers
Year of birth missing (living people)